Self-transcendence is a personality trait that involves the expansion of personal boundaries, including, potentially, experiencing spiritual ideas such as considering oneself an integral part of the universe. 
Several psychologists, including Viktor Frankl, Abraham Maslow, Pamela G. Reed, C. Robert Cloninger, Lars Tornstam, and Scott Barry Kaufman have made contributions to the theory of self-transcendence. 

Self-transcendence is distinctive as the first trait concept of a spiritual nature to be incorporated into a major theory of personality. Self-transcendence is one of the "character" dimensions of personality assessed in Cloninger's Temperament and Character Inventory. It is also assessed by the Self-Transcendence Scale and the Adult Self-Transcendence Inventory.

Nature of the trait 
Several overlapping definitions of self-transcendence have been given. Viktor Frankl wrote, "The essentially self-transcendent quality of human existence renders man a being reaching out beyond himself."

According to Reed, self-transcendence is:
the capacity to expand self-boundaries intrapersonally (toward greater awareness of one's philosophy, values, and dreams), interpersonally (to relate to others' and one's environment), temporally (to integrate one's past and future in a way that has meaning for the present), and transpersonally (to connect with dimensions beyond the typically discernible world).

Taking a developmental perspective concerning aging and transcendence, Tornstam defined the concept of gerotranscendence as "a shift in metaperspective, from a midlife materialistic and rational vision to a more cosmic and transcendent one, accompanied by an increase in life satisfaction."

In Cloninger's seven-dimensional model of personality, there are four temperament dimensions that have a strong biological basis, and three learned character dimensions that are believed to be concept-based. Self-transcendence is a character trait considered to relate to the experience of spiritual aspects of the self. The concept was influenced by theories of personality development in humanistic and transpersonal psychology. Self-transcendence refers to an identification of the self with the universe conceived as a unitive whole. According to Cloninger, this "may be described as acceptance, identification, or spiritual union with nature and its source."

Components 

Self-transcendence as assessed in the Temperament and Character Inventory originally had three subscales, but two more were later added:

 Self-forgetful vs. self-conscious experience
 Transpersonal identification vs. self-isolation
 Spiritual acceptance vs. rational materialism
 Enlightened vs. objective
 Idealistic vs. practical

An independent study found that the five subscales proposed by Cloninger were difficult to replicate using factor analysis and suggested that the self-transcendence scale of the Temperament and Character Inventory is better represented by four sub-dimensions:

 Spiritual and religious beliefs (e.g., belief in the existence of a higher power)
 Unifying interconnectedness (i.e., an experienced sense of connection with other living beings, the environment, and a higher power)
 Belief in the supernatural (e.g., belief in paranormal phenomena, such as extrasensory perception)
 Dissolution of self in experience (e.g., absorption, or a loss of sense of separate self while immersed in experience)

The Adult Self-Transcendence Inventory has five subscales:
 
 Self-knowledge and self-integration
 Peace of mind
 Non-attachment
 Self-transcendence
 Presence in the here-and-now and growth

Relationship to other personality traits 
Coward (1996) found positive correlations between self-transcendence, hope, purpose in life, and cognitive and emotional well-being in a study of healthy adults ages 19 to 85. Negative correlation has been found between self-transcendence as measured by Reed's Self-Transcendence Scale and depression in both middle-aged and older adults.

Although there has not been a great deal of research into the validity of self-transcendence as a measure of spirituality, one study found that self-transcendence was significantly related to a number of areas of belief and experience that have been traditionally considered "spiritual".

A study relating the Temperament and Character Inventory to the Five factor model personality traits found that self-transcendence was most strongly related to openness to experience and to a lesser extent extraversion. Self-transcendence is largely unrelated to traits in Zuckerman's "Alternative five" model and Eysenck's model which do not include an equivalent to openness to experience. Self-transcendence is strongly related to absorption.

Relationship to psychopathology 

Cloninger found that psychiatric patients tend to be lower in self-transcendence compared with adults in the general population. Low self-transcendence was found to be particularly evident in patients with many symptoms of schizoid personality disorder but is otherwise not a common feature of people with personality disorders. This is in contrast to the traits of cooperativeness and self-directedness which have been found to be low in personality disorder profiles generally. Cloninger suggested that self-transcendence levels may help differentiate between people with schizoid and those with schizotypal personality disorder as the latter is more strongly associated with psychotic thinking.

Psychosis proneness and psychotic symptoms 
High self-transcendence has been linked to psychotic tendencies, such as schizotypy and mania, particularly in individuals low in both self-directedness and cooperativeness.

Cloninger proposed that self-transcendence leads to "mature creativity and spirituality" when coupled with high self-directedness. However, self-transcendence may be associated with psychotic tendencies when associated with underdeveloped character traits. Self-transcendence in itself is moderately related to schizotypy, particularly the cognitive-perceptual component associated with magical thinking and unusual perceptions. A research study found that the specific combination of high self-transcendence, low cooperativeness, and low self-directedness was especially associated with a high risk of overall schizotypy. Another study found that people with schizophrenia also had a combination of high self-transcendence, low cooperativeness, and low self-directedness compared to non-psychotic siblings and a community control group. Cloninger has referred to the specific combination of high self-transcendence, low cooperativeness, and low self-directedness as a "schizotypal personality style". Low cooperativeness and self-directedness combined with high self-transcendence may result in openness to odd or unusual ideas and behaviours associated with distorted perceptions of reality. On the other hand, high levels of cooperativeness and self-directedness may protect against the schizotypal tendencies associated with high self-transcendence.

People with bipolar disorder have been found to score higher in self-transcendence and harm avoidance, and lower in self-directedness compared to a community control group. Levels of self-transcendence in particular were found to be associated with severity of psychotic symptoms in people with bipolar disorder. This accords with previous research findings linking self-transcendence to delusions and mania. Higher self-transcendence in people with bipolar may reflect residual symptoms of the disorder rather than transpersonal or spiritual consciousness.

MacDonald and Holland argued that two of the four sub-dimensions of self-transcendence identified in their study, belief in the supernatural and dissolution of the self in experience, probably account for the relationship between self-transcendence and psychopathology found by researchers. Previous research has found linkages between supernatural beliefs and schizotypy, and they suggested that dissolution of the self is likely to be linked to phenomena such as absorption, dissociation, and suggestibility, which have potentially pathological implications.

Validity 

Criticisms have been made of Cloninger's conception of self-transcendence. Although Cloninger proposed that character traits, including self-transcendence, are wholly learned, more recent research suggests that biological and genetic factors play an important role in how self-transcendence is expressed. Although humanistic and transpersonal theories of psychology have maintained that spirituality is an essential component of health and well-being, published research using the Temperament and Character Inventory has linked self-transcendence to various aspects of mental illness. Cloninger and colleagues have even proposed more recently that self-transcendence may represent a subclinical manifestation of mood and psychotic disorders.

Additionally of concern is the paucity of research evaluating the validity of the self-transcendence as a measure of spiritual aspects of personality. Evidence relevant to the validity of the scale is provided by a study by MacDonald and Holland who found that people who were convinced that they had had a spiritual experience scored higher on self-transcendence compared to those who had not. Additionally they found that self-transcendence had positive and meaningful associations with four areas of spirituality: beliefs about the existence and relevance of spirituality; spiritual experience; paranormal beliefs; and traditional religiousness. (Although the dissolution of the self sub-dimension of self-transcendence had little relation with these things.) However, self-transcendence was largely unrelated to existential well-being. The latter was most strongly related to the Temperament and Character Inventory traits of high self-directedness and low harm avoidance. Self-directedness is associated with self-control and adaptability, whereas low harm avoidance is associated with emotional well-being. This suggests that self-transcendence may be a valid measure of areas of spirituality relating to spiritual beliefs, spiritual experiences, paranormal beliefs, and traditional religiousness, but is unrelated to having a sense of meaning and purpose in life which is more related to other features of personality. Additionally, the dissolution of the self in experience aspect of self-transcendence appears to have little relationship with spirituality and may be related to the more pathological aspects of the trait.

Contribution to quality of life
People with schizophrenia tend to have poorer self-rated quality of life compared to the general population. However, a study of individual differences in people with schizophrenia found that higher scores on self-transcendence and self-directedness and lower scores on harm avoidance were associated with better self-ratings of quality of life. The authors suggested that this finding accords with previous studies finding that spirituality in people with schizophrenia is associated with better adjustment to illness.

Self-transcendence is correlated with schizophrenia, depersonalization disorder, or the dark triad, mystical experiences, mindfulness, peak experiences, flow and positive emotions. According to David Bryce Yaden, it consists in a reduced role of the personal ego in order to establish an increased relational connectedness with the external world.

Notes

See also

 Altered states of consciousness
 Ecstasy (emotion)
 Enlightenment (spiritual)
 Maslow's hierarchy of needs
 Mystical psychosis
 Mysticism
 Nondualism
 Oceanic feeling
 Open individualism
 Religious ecstasy
 Religious experience
 Soul flight
 Transcendentalism

References 

Personality disorders
Personality traits
Spiritual evolution